Meldrick Taylor (born October 19, 1966) is an American former professional boxer who competed from 1984 to 2002. He is a two-weight world champion, having held the IBF junior welterweight title from 1988 to 1990, and the WBA welterweight title from 1991 to 1992. As an amateur, Taylor won a gold medal in the featherweight division at the 1984 Summer Olympics.

Amateur career
Taylor, one of many boxing champions hailing from the city of Philadelphia, Pennsylvania, learned his craft in the gyms of his hometown and posted a 99-4 record as an amateur fighter. In 1984, Taylor earned a spot on the 1984 U.S. Olympic team at the age of 17, and claimed the gold medal in the featherweight division. Following his victory, he joined the professional ranks.

1984 Olympic results
Round of 64: 
Round of 32: Defeated Nicolae Talpos (Romania) 5-0
Round of 16: Defeated Francisco Camacho (Mexico) 5-0
Quarterfinal: Defeated John Wanjau (Kenya) referee stopped contest in the third round
Semifinal: Defeated Omar Catari (Venezuela) 5-0
Final: Defeated Peter Konyegwachie (Nigeria) 5-0 (won gold medal)

In the American Olympic trials Taylor lost to Andrew Minsker, who then went on to win the trials. However, Taylor beat Minsker twice back to back to earn the spot in the Olympic box-offs.

Professional career
His early fights were against nondescript journeymen, but in his 12th fight, in May 1986, Taylor won a unanimous decision against fellow contender Harold Brazier and moved into the world rankings. On September 3, 1988, Taylor faced James (Buddy) McGirt for the IBF light welterweight title. He defeated McGirt by a technical knockout (TKO) in the 12th and final round to begin his first title reign.

Taylor vs. Chávez

Over the next 18 months, Taylor won four more fights, setting up a unification bout with the WBC light welterweight champion Julio César Chávez on March 17, 1990 in Las Vegas. Chavez had an aura of invincibility, he was considered the best fighter pound for pound in the world and also one of the most dangerous fighters in the sport. This fight drew huge media attention, as both men came in unbeaten (Taylor at 24-0-1 and Chávez at 66-0), and regarded as two of the best boxers in the world, regardless of weight class. Their fight was one of the most famous and controversial bouts in boxing history.

Taylor took control of the action early and began to build up a lead on the scorecards. However, Chávez proved to be a heavier puncher, and was slowly wearing Taylor down even as he lost rounds. Going to the 12th and final round, Taylor led by wide margins on two of the three scorecards, and his corner famously told him that he needed to win that round. Because of this, Taylor chose to continue fighting at close quarters with the hard-hitting Mexican champion. Chávez, realizing time was running out, came at Taylor aggressively in the last round. With 17 seconds left in the fight, Chávez floored Taylor. Taylor beat the 10-count and got back to his feet at six. Referee Richard Steele twice asked Taylor, "Are you ok?" Taylor did not respond and only looked at his corner. Steele waved the fight off with just two seconds left, awarding Chávez a win by TKO.

The controversy surrounding the stoppage continues to this day, and 10 years later, The Ring proclaimed it the "Fight of the Decade".

Many boxing fans believe that Taylor was essentially 'ruined' as a fighter because of this bout—due in part to the tremendous punishment taken at the hands of Chavez, including several fractures and some kidney damage (according to the HBO "Legendary Nights" episode mentioned before, he was taken to the hospital immediately after the Chavez bout—reportedly urinating blood.)

WBA welterweight champion
Taylor had lost his title, but not his desire. Feeling that having to make the 140 pound (64 kg) weight had weakened him against Chavez, Taylor moved up to welterweight (147 pounds) and decisioned undefeated Aaron Davis for the WBA welterweight title on January 19, 1991. He issued a challenge to Chávez for a rematch at 147 pounds, but the latter wouldn't move up in weight for many years. Taylor won three more fights before answering a challenge from world junior middleweight champion Terry Norris to fight for Norris' WBC title. Norris, a naturally bigger and stronger man, knocked Taylor out in the fourth round.

This marked the end of Taylor's career as a world-class fighter; he lost the welterweight crown to undefeated challenger Crisanto España in his next fight on Halloween night in 1992. Taylor won his following three fights, including a second-round knockout over number four ranked welterweight Chad Broussard. He got one more title shot, against Chávez on September 17, 1994 in Las Vegas, but, years removed from his prime, he was stopped by Chávez in the eighth round.  The fight was competitive, with Taylor getting off to a fast start.  But after a brutal sixth round, Taylor's legs became rubbery and he was stopped 2 rounds later. Taylor was suspended by The State Athletic Commission in 1997 for failing to appear at a bout in Altoona, PA. It was scheduled for April 6, 1997 against 18-0 Ken Sigurani In a 10-round welterweight event.

He fought off and on over the next couple of years, winning some fights and losing others, before retiring in 2002. He finished with a record of 38-8-1, (20 KOs).

During an episode of HBO's "Legendary Nights" in 2003, an interview with Taylor was shown, in which his speech was very slurred and difficult to understand. Many viewers were shocked and disturbed when they heard the way Taylor now speaks.  Indeed, the episode implicitly attributed this to pugilistic dementia—mentioning, time and again, how Taylor was well past his prime as a fighter.

Meldrick Taylor has written his autobiography, titled Two Seconds From Glory.

2019 arrest
Meldrick Taylor was arrested on Tuesday, June 4, 2019 in North Philadelphia morning after he allegedly threatened a man with a gun and engaged in a 90-minute standoff with police at his residence. Taylor was charged with aggravated assault, possession of an instrument of crime and terroristic threats. He was later released on an unsecured bond.

Personal
Meldrick Taylor has a twin brother, Eldrick, who was also briefly a professional boxer. Eldrick Taylor compiled a record of 0 wins and 1 loss. Another brother, Myron, on the other hand, also competed as a professional boxer who had a record of 29 wins (16 by knockout), 9 losses and one draw (tie), and who once challenged for a world title.

Professional boxing record

References

External links
 
 
 
 

1966 births
Living people
African-American boxers
Olympic boxers of the United States
Light-welterweight boxers
Welterweight boxers
Boxers from Philadelphia
Boxers at the 1984 Summer Olympics
World Boxing Association champions
International Boxing Federation champions
Olympic gold medalists for the United States in boxing
American male boxers
Medalists at the 1984 Summer Olympics
Featherweight boxers
World light-welterweight boxing champions
World welterweight boxing champions
Light-middleweight boxers
21st-century African-American people
20th-century African-American sportspeople
People charged with assault